Okan Kadri Ersoy (born September 5, 1945 in İstanbul, Turkey) is a professor of electrical engineering and Director of Statistical and Computational Intelligence Laboratory at Purdue University, West Lafayette School of Electrical and Computer Engineering. He is a Fellow of IEEE, a Fellow of OSA and a Fellow of ISIBM. Ersoy contributed to the research and education in computer science and engineering, artificial intelligence and bioinformatics. He is on the editorial boards of International Journal of Functional Informatics and Personalized Medicine and International Journal of Computational Biology and Drug Design. He is also on the advisory board of IJCBS.

Biography
He received B.S.E.E. degree from Boğaziçi University (Formerly Robert College) in Istanbul in 1967; M.S.E.E. degree in 1968, MS degree in Systems Science and PhD in Electrical Engineering in 1972 respectively, all from University of California at Los Angeles (UCLA) with specialization on Lasers, Quantum Electronics, Optics and Image Processing.

Research areas
His current research is concentrated in the fields of digital signal/image processing and imaging, neural networks, decision trees and support vector machines, optical communications, networking and information processing, diffractive optics with scanning electron microscope, Fourier-related transforms and time-frequency methods, probability and statistics. He has written many books on signal, image processing and fast transforms.

Books 
 Diffraction, Fourier Optics and Imaging

References

External links 
 Website at Purdue
 DOI.org
 https://docs.lib.purdue.edu/ecetr/69/
 http://sru.lib.purdue.edu/dir/sru?operation=searchRetrieve&recordSchema=dc&maximumRecords=50&sortKeys=DateCreated,0&recordXpath=&stylesheet=http%3A//www.lib.purdue.edu/research/sru/etd/etd.xsl&ScanClause=&version=1.1&recordPacking=xml&query=adviser+%3D+%22Ersoy%22+and+%22Okan%22

Boğaziçi University alumni
Academic staff of Boğaziçi University
UCLA Henry Samueli School of Engineering and Applied Science alumni
Purdue University faculty
Living people
1945 births
Optical engineers
Systems engineers
American bioengineers
American electronics engineers
Turkish electronics engineers
Turkish electrical engineers
Turkish bioengineers
Turkish mathematicians
American academics of Turkish descent
Fellow Members of the IEEE
Fellows of Optica (society)